David or Dave Ross may refer to:

Actors and directors
Dave Ross (born 1952), American radio talk show host and actor
David Ross (actor) (born 1945), British actor who played Kryten in the second series of BBC sitcom Red Dwarf
David Ross (actor, born 1728) (1728–1790), English actor
David Ross (director), American filmmaker; director of The Babysitters
David W. Ross, English actor and writer; starred in Quinceañera and was a member of the British boy band Bad Boys Inc

Sportspeople
Dave Ross (rower) (born 1963), Canadian rower
David Ross (American football) (born 1959), college football coach in the United States
David Ross (baseball) (born 1977), American Major League baseball manager and former player
David Ross (trampolinist) (born 1950), Canadian trampoline coach and equipment manufacturer
Davie Ross (Scottish footballer) (born 1951), Scottish footballer
David Ross (sport shooter) (born 1940), American sports shooter
Dave Ross (American football) (born 1938), American football player
Dave Ross (rugby league) (1917–1998), Australian rugby league player

Other
Dave Ross (politician), Wisconsin politician
David Ross, Lord Ankerville (1727–1805) Scottish law lord
David Ross (aviator), Australian intelligence officer and consul 
David Ross (businessman) (born 1965), English businessman, co-founder of Carphone Warehouse
David Ross (comics), Persuasion and Pestilence
David Ross (Continental Congress) (1755–1800), American lawyer, Continental Congress representative from Maryland
David Ross (naval officer), officer in the Continental Navy
David R. Ross (1958–2010), Scottish author and historian
Sir W. D. Ross (William David Ross, 1877–1971), Scottish moral philosopher, translator of Aristotle, and academic
David Robert Ross (1797–1851), MP for Belfast, 1842–1847, Governor of Tobago 1851
David Alexander Ross (1819–1897), lawyer, businessman and political figure in Quebec
David Edward Ross (1871–1943), American inventor and Purdue University philanthropist
David Ross (lawyer), environmental and land-use lawyer, candidate for EPA position
David Ross (minister) (1857–1931) founder of Scotch College, Perth